The Fethiye Mosque ("Mosque of the Conquest") is an Ottoman mosque in Ioannina, Greece.

The mosque was built in the city's inner castle (Its Kale) immediately after the conquest by the Ottomans in 1430, near the ruins of an early 13th-century Byzantine church dedicated to the Archangels Michael and Gabriel. Originally it was a wooden structure, which was replaced in 1611 by a stone building. It was extensively remodelled in 1795 by Ali Pasha, who made it the main mosque of his palace. The graves of Ali's family and of Ali himself are located before the mosque.

References

External links 

Ottoman mosques in Greece
17th-century mosques
Former mosques in Greece
Ottoman architecture in Ioannina
18th-century mosques
Ali Pasha of Ioannina
18th-century architecture in Greece
Mosques completed in 1430